Karen Kay may refer to:
 Karen Kay (author)
 Karen Kay (TV personality)